Vance Lodge, near the North Fork of the Flathead River near Polebridge, Montana, was built in 1920.   It was listed on the National Register of Historic Places in 1994.

The  area listed included four contributing buildings, one contributing structure, and one contributing site.  Two other structures were non-contributing.

It was built on the 160 acre claim homesteaded in 1914 by Andy and Ella Vance.

References

Farms on the National Register of Historic Places in Montana
Buildings and structures completed in 1920
Rustic architecture in Montana
National Register of Historic Places in Flathead County, Montana
1920 establishments in Montana